In military terms, 106th Division or 106th Infantry Division may refer to:

106th Division (Imperial Japanese Army)
106th Division (People's Republic of China)
106th Guards Airborne Division – Russia
106th Infantry Division (United States)

sl:Seznam divizij po zaporednih številkah (100. - 149.)#106. divizija